Heartbreak on Hold is the second studio album by British recording artist Alexandra Burke. It was released digitally on 1 June 2012 through Syco and RCA Records, and a physical version was issued three days later. The album marks her final record with both record labels, parting between 2012 and the following year. Burke started working on the album in late 2010, and collaborated with Cutfather, Erick Morillo, Autumn Rowe, and Ben Adams, amongst others. Burke had also worked with RedOne, who previously produced a chunk of her debut album Overcome (2009), but none of the recordings were included on this album.

Described by Burke as an album full of "risks", Heartbreak on Hold is a dance record that include elements of house, EDM, Eurodance and R&B. Despite the record being pre-conceived in 2010, the lyrical content and themes are loosely inspired by her breakup with Jermain Defoe in 2012. Some tracks discuss about being free and having fun after heartbreak, and also encompass themes of love, dancing and female empowerment. The album's title was also inspired by her departure from Defoe.

Heartbreak on Hold suffered a long series of delays to its release. It was originally scheduled to premiere in mid-2011, but was scrapped for unknown reasons. Eventually, the label schedule to release in early 2012, but was pulled due to her departure with Syco that following year. RCA decided to re-schedule its release date on 1 June 2012 worldwide, and focus on physical versions in the United Kingdom and parts of Europe. Upon its release, Heartbreak on Hold received mixed reviews from music critics. The production and commercial appeal was noted positively by critics, but were ambivalent on its lack of depth, the lyrical content and generic composition.

Commercially, Heartbreak on Hold performed moderately in her native country. It opened at number 18 on the UK Albums Chart, under-performing in comparison to her previous record Overcome (2009). Two singles spawned from the album: "Elephant" and "Let It Go". The former reached the top three on the UK Singles Chart, achieving a long-run success in that region, whilst the latter track underperformed by reaching the top 40.

Background and production

On 15 September 2010, Burke confirmed the early stages of her second studio album. She stated that it would be more of a "risk" from her debut release. Two months later, Burke revealed that she had started working on the album via her official Twitter account. Half of the record had already been complete by December 2010, and planned on working with frequent collaborator RedOne once again to finish the rest of the album. Moreover, she had ambitions to work with American artists and producers Bruno Mars, Ne-Yo and StarGate in hopes of partaking in a duet to the album. In mid-2011, Burke had signed an album deal with RCA Records, and would release the record with Syco. In August 2011, Burke revealed that she was executive producer of the album too, explaining; "[...] With the first album [Overcome] when songs were being mixed, Simon [Cowell] was the one who picked the tracklisting. But with this one, I haven't let anything go past these ears. I approve everything." Burke also wrote certain tracks for the record, which was a first for her.

Recording for Heartbreak on Hold commenced in late-2010, and confirmed by December that year that half of the record had been complete. She explained the process by saying,"We’re just getting down and dirty with the next album. I’m going to take a lot more risks and it's going to be insane." Additionally, she revealed that there was a "special duet planned". The following month, Burke updated that she had worked with an "amazing" American artist, but refrained from any further information. She elaborated, "I went to New York in December and it just happened, it wasn't planned. At 7am I was in the studio and cut a song with an amazing person, a male artist."

One of the album's collaborators, American recording artist Autumn Rowe, confirmed her work with Burke. She stated, "I've cut the first record on hers that I ever did, which is going to be on her album, but I can't tell you the name – we did that whole song in 45 minutes. She walked in, I was like, 'Nice to meet you, I love you, let's go'. 45 minutes later, the record was done. Boom." Additionally, Colombian DJ Erick Morillo was confirmed to be a featuring artist to the record, specifically on the track "Elephant". She referred to their expected material as "colorful" and "over-the-top". Originally, most of the album was to consist of many duets that Burke had wanted to record, but the final track listing ended up being more about Burke's own voice and point of view and "the message [she] is trying to get across."

Despite ongoing work with Heartbreak on Hold, Burke went on a recording hiatus in order to conduct her All Night Long Tour throughout the United Kingdom between January to August 2011. The tour took over seven months in total, and resumed activities with the album once the tour was complete. Burke anticipated to release material that year, but was postponed because of this. By mid-August 2011, Burke confirmed the completion of the album.

Musicality and songs

Musically, Heartbreak on Hold is a departure from her previous work, and is a dance record that include elements of house, EDM, Eurodance and R&B. Matt Collar, a writer from AllMusic, immediately noted the difference between Outcome and this record, saying "Heartbreak on Hold, finds the singer shifting away from the pop/R&B of her debut to a more dance- and club-oriented sound." During the early stages of making Heartbreak on Hold, Burke had discussed that she was intending to take risks for the record. In an interview with Digital Spy, she elaborated; "In terms of album two, I've gone in a slightly different direction [...] It's not completely different but it's going to be a lot sexier and a lot more fun." In contrast to her debut record Overcome (2009), Burke stated, "A second album should not sound like the first one. I want to better myself and that takes hard work and time. My music has always been R&B and pop, but my voice is soulful. I want every genre of music in a blender: mix it together, the outcome is me."

The album open with its title track, a europop number which features rave-inspired synths and heavy-bass lines that lingers throughout a massive portion of the album. "Elephant", a duet with DJ Erick Morillo, is one of two songs co-written by Burke. Inspired by 1990s music and culture, "Elephant" is a heavy electro tune that incorporates Autotune and vocoder pyrotechnics through Burke's vocals. "Let It Go", the album's second single, boasts a 90s-influenced sound that draws in musical elements of house and club music. Lyrically, the track speaks on letting go and having fun; Burke commented, "It's simply about letting go of life's stresses. Let it go, have fun, live life and smile and be happy." "This Love Will Survive" is a love song that follows a similar dance-remedy, but includes orchestral instrumentation and a "rousy melody" that was compared to the work of British group Coldplay. "Fire" was described by Burke as a "sexy, female empowering" number that is sung above a heavy house beat. Both "Fire" and "This Love Will Survive" were compared to the works of American artists Lady Gaga and Robin S., and British group Coldplay. "Between the Sheets" is the album's first midtempo number, and was positively noted for its slower pace whilst still working within the album's primary dance sound. Lyrically, the track talks about sex and its importance in a relationship.

"Daylight Robbery" is the album's seventh track, and was produced by Michael Woods. Lyrically, it talks about a guy that "steals your heart and you didn't think it would happen." "Tonight" is a track originally performed and produced by Russian musician DJ Smash and Fast Foods. Originally titled "Wave", the composition was given to Burke to record, and was later covered by Romanian singer Inna for her album Party Never Ends (2013). "Love You That Much" is a song dedicated to her fan base, and is an uptempo dance number that was compared to the work of Australian singer Kylie Minogue. According to Burke, the following track, "Oh La La", is about "Making that guy work for it. If you want me for the night, even for the first kiss, money where you're mouth is." "Oh La La" samples a portion of its beat from the song "Gypsy Woman (She's Homeless)" by Crystal Waters. "Sitting on Top of the World" discusses her lifestyle as a young child, and talks about having fun and learning life lessons from her parents. Musically, it is a club-inspired number with a midtempo beat. The album closes with the piano ballad "What Money Can't Buy", one of the two songs written by Burke.

Release and artwork
Heartbreak on Hold and its singles suffered numerous delays, before eventually being released in June 2012. Burke had anticipated to release the record in late 2011, but was pushed back to an unknown date. Media speculated its postponement was made to avoid any clashes with albums from fellow X Factor alumni including Matt Cardle, Cher Lloyd, One Direction and Leona Lewis. In early August 2011, Burke confirmed its first single, "Elephant", would be released in a few weeks. This was not until Burke confirmed that promotions were delayed by her record label Syco Music, apologizing online for the inconvenience. Burke further relayed that the album was not in any turmoil of being delayed, and said she would speak upon the issue if it did happen.

Three months after much speculation, Burke confirmed to Digital Spy that the album would be delayed till 2012 so she could complete the record. Onwards, "Elephant" was first to commence promotional activities on 26 February 2012, but was pushed back again to 11 March 2012. On 13 April 2012, Burke revealed that the album was titled, Heartbreak on Hold, and would be released on 4 June 2012. On picking the album track, Heartbreak on Hold, as the album title Burke revealed; "When I first heard the song [Heartbreak on Hold] it spoke a lot about what I'd been through in the past year-and-a-half in terms of making my album, stuff that went on in my personal life and I'm the kind of girl that has learnt to turn anything negative into a positive." On 2 May 2012, Burke debuted the artwork and tracklisting for the album, followed by a 30-second sample of each song.

Critical reception

Heartbreak on Hold received mixed reviews from music critics. Certain critics welcomed Burke's transition into dance and house music. AllMusic editor Matt Collar awarded the album three-and-a-half stars out of five, immediately noticing her musical shift from pop and R&B to a "club-oriented sound". He compared a few tracks to the work of Burke's mother and former Soul II Soul vocalist Melissa Bell, and also noted American singers Lady Gaga, Robin S., Janet Jackson, and AUstralian singer Kylie Minogue. He highlighted the title track, "Love You That Much" and "Daylight Robbery" as the album's key tracks, and also listed them, alongside "Elephant", as some of her career highlights. Caroline Sullivan, writing for The Guardian, commented that "The album falls back on the Auto-Tuned pyrotechnics and clinical club-pop that has currently turned the singles chart into a featureless wasteland, Burke follows a well-travelled road, losing her likable personality en route." Simon Gage from Daily Express agreed, writing: "It seems to be very little charisma on this new album of driving pop/dance that she insists has an emotional underpinning."

Andy Gill from The Independent commented: "The songs (only two of which are actually written by her) cover the well-trodden terrain of heartbreak and hope, while the plethora of producers renders the music blandly generic, another round of Guetta-style synth-stomps and incessant keyboard vamps, largely interchangeable with those on Rihanna's and Madonna's last albums." A more mixed review came from The Observers writer Hermione Hoby who criticised the album, writing: "Heartbreak On Hold is a strong argument for a moratorium on songs featuring effects-laden instances of the word "tonight". It seems to feature in almost every track on Alexandra Burke's second album of relentlessly unimaginative house, each excessively Auto-Tuned Euro-club banger indistinguishable from the next."

Jenny Mensah from 4Music gave the album 2.5 out of 5 stars, writing: "Alexandra Burke’s second album has some catchy tunes, smooth sounds and great production. However, where this album works best is when it blends the right amount of beats, synths and vocal licks. At times the energy does fall in favour of slower songs like Between The Sheets, but it's with these songs you hear the full force of Alexandra's vocals, without any heavy auto-tuning." Though Robert Corspey from Digital Spy praised the album's material for its catchy melodies and production, he stated; "The message [on Heartbreak on Hold] is simple: to forget life's troubles and have a good time. Which would be fine, if the charts weren't already clogged up with similar affirmations to the same Euro-pop tune."

Commercial performance 
Heartbreak on Hold received a mediocre chart performance in Ireland. It marked her lowest performing album to date, charting at number 27 on 8 June 2012. In the United Kingdom, the album debuted at number 18. In the United Kingdom, the album sold 6,731 copies in its first week. In its third week the album fell to 92 with sales of 1,565 copies, raising its three-week tally to 10,571, just 4.73% of same stage sales of the 223,407 sales for Overcome. Tonight reached the top of the airplay charts in Greece and has remained in the top ten for four months. Tonight has continued success over Europe.

Promotion

Singles
Heartbreak on Hold spawned two singles during its promotional activities. The first single was "Elephant", featuring and produced by Colombian musician Erick Morillo. Despite continuous delays, the song was released on 9 March 2012 on digital formats. "Elephant" received mixed reviews from music critics, with most critics being ambivalent towards the track's production, composition and use of Autotune and Vocoder effects. Commercially, it debuted and peaked at number three on the UK Singles Chart, with first-week sales of 42,387. It remains Burke's second highest-charting single in the UK, and a return to the top ten after the performance of her single "The Silence" from Overcome (2009) reached number 16. A music video was released in early April 2012, featuring the singer with backup dancers having fun and performing in an underground facility.

"Let it Go" served as the album's second single on 22 May 2015, and was released in digital formats. Critically, the song attracted mixed reviews from critics. Some praised its composition and catchy melody, whilst some criticized its generic production and lack of personality through its lyrical content. Commercially, "Let It Go" underperformed by reaching number 33 on the UK Singles Chart, becoming her lowest-charting single. Moreover, it debuted at number 33 on the UK Digital Chart with download sales of 11,586. In its second week on the chart, "Let It Go" fell to number 74, selling 4,461 copies. Initially, Burke spoke with Digital Spy at T4 on the Beach in early July 2012, and confirmed that her record label had scheduled a third single, and would featured a male artist. However, these plans never came to fruition.

Live performances
Burke performed "Let It Go" on series finale of The Voice of Ireland on 29 April 2012. In the United Kingdom, Burke performed "Let It Go" on breakfast television show Lorraine on 22 May 2012, where she also gave an interview about the song and Heartbreak on Hold. Burke performed at Signal 1's Stoke 2012 Live festival weekend on 16 June 2012. Burke also played a live acoustic set in Le Mans, France on 15 June 2012.

In June 2012, Burke appeared at London nightclub G-A-Y to perform tracks from the album on the night before its release. Burke then appeared on daytime TV show Loose Women where she performed an acoustic version of title track "Heartbreak on Hold". Burke recorded four songs in front of a handful of fans for an event called "An Audience with Alexandra Burke". The performance was recorded and uploaded by That Grapejuice. Burke performed at Liverpool Arena for Radio City Live 2012 on 21 July. On 19 July 2012, Burke performed at Manchester's MEN Arena. Burke joined One Direction, Rizzle Kicks, Little Mix and Will Young at KEY 103 Live in Manchester on 22 July 2012. Burke also appeared at Party In The Park in Leeds on the same date. On 15 September, Burke headlined at Scotland's Youth Beatz music festival. On 2 August, Burke performed a concert in London's Hyde Park. The event was part of BT's London Live celebrations for the 2012 Summer Olympics.

The press featured numerous articles outlining that the UK's national radio stations were refusing to playlist Burke's new material.

Track listing 

Notes
 "Oh La La" interpolates portions of the composition entitled "Gypsy Woman (She's Homeless)" by Crystal Waters.
 "Devil in Me" interpolates portions of the composition entitled "Love Sensation" by Loleatta Holloway.

Charts

Release history

References

2012 albums
Alexandra Burke albums
Dance-pop albums by English artists
RCA Records albums
Syco Music albums
Albums produced by Cutfather
Albums produced by Fred Falke